Lenora Nemetz is an American stage and musical theatre actress.

Career
Nemetz left her native Pittsburgh as a teenager to work on Broadway. Her Broadway debut was in Cabaret. 

A protégé of Bob Fosse, Nemetz first came to the attention of New York critics when she understudied and later succeeded Chita Rivera as Velma Kelly in Fosse's production of Chicago. In a 2007 posting on the BroadwayWorld message board, Nemetz recalled how she got to play both Roxie Hart and Velma Kelly on the same day during the original production of Chicago:

"I replaced Chita, with Ann Reinking and with Gwenn [sic] (Verdon) ... and I played both roles - I stood by for both Gwenn and Chita, and they were kind enough to let me play both roles in the same day. At the matinee I played Velma Kelly and in the evening performance I played Roxie Hart. It was fun!!"

Nemetz also created the role of Delores Dante in the Broadway production of Working, earning a Drama Desk Award nomination. She appeared with Peter Allen in his one man show Up in One both on Broadway and in Los Angeles. She then co-starred with Chita Rivera as Angel in The Rink filling in for Liza Minnelli. 

Nemetz made her New York City opera debut in the role of Gladys in the revival of The Pajama Game. In 2008, she appeared in The Patti LuPone revival of Gypsy on Broadway, playing Mazeppa and Miss Kratchitt; she was also standby for LuPone as Rose. National tours have included Sweet Charity, Bye Bye Birdie, Cabaret and Some Like it Hot. 

Nemetz has remained a prominent actress in Pittsburgh theatre, having appeared over the years in productions at Pittsburgh Civic Light Opera, Pittsburgh Musical Theater, City Theater, and Pittsburgh Public Theater.

Performances
Murder on the Orient Express (Pittsburgh) 2022 - Helen Hubbard
Oklahoma (Pittsburgh) 2011 - Aunt Eller
Nunsense (Pittsburgh) 2010, 2011 - Sister Robert Anne
Gypsy Broadway (Broadway Revival) 2008 - Mazeppa, Miss Cratchitt, Rose (Standby)
Café Puttanesca (Regional US) World Premiere, 2003 - The Baroness
Hello Dolly (Pittsburgh) 2002 - Dolly Levi
Some Like It Hot (US Tour) First Class National Tour, 2002 - Sweet Sue
Cabaret (US Tour) National Tour, 1999 - Fraulein Kost (Replacement)
Bye Bye Birdie (US Tour) Touring Revival, 1991 - Rose Alvarez
The Pajama Game (Off-Broadway) New York City Opera Revival, 1989 - Gladys
Show Boat (Milburn, NJ; Regional) Paper Mill Production, 1989 - Ellie
Anything Goes (Pittsburgh) Pittsburgh Playhouse, 1988
Sweet Charity (US Tour) National Tour, 1987 - Nickie; Charity (Standby)
A Chorus Line (Pittsburgh) Pittsburgh Playhouse, 1985- Cassie
The Rink (Broadway) Original Broadway Production, 1984 - Angel (Standby)
America Kicks Up Its Heels (Off-Broadway) Original Off-Broadway Production, 1983 - Hennie
Peter Allen: Up in One Concert (Broadway) 1979 - Performer
Working (Original Broadway Production) 1978 - Performer: Terry Mason (stewardess), Babe Secoli (supermarket checker), Delores Dante (waitress)
Spotlight (Broadway) Closed on the road, 1978 - Performer
Chicago Original Broadway Production, 1975 Roxie Hart (Replacement), Velma Kelly (Replacement), Roxie Hart (Standby)
Cabaret Original Broadway Production, 1966 - Fritzie (Replacement)

References

External links

Actresses from Pittsburgh
American stage actresses
Living people
Year of birth missing (living people)
21st-century American women